The 2018–19 Iraqi Premier League was the 45th season of the Iraqi Premier League, the highest division for Iraqi association football clubs, since its establishment in 1974. The season started on 14 September 2018 and ended on 24 July 2019.

A two-horse title race ensued for most of the season and Al-Shorta ended up as champions by finishing five points ahead of Al-Quwa Al-Jawiya at the top of the table. During this season, Al-Shorta managed to equal the record of 39 consecutive Iraqi Premier League matches undefeated set by Al-Zawraa in 1994. The club's manager Nebojša Jovović became the first manager from Europe to win the Iraqi Premier League title.

Teams

League table

Results

Season statistics

Top scorers

Hat-tricks

Notes
4 Player scored 4 goals

Awards

See also
 2018–19 Iraq FA Cup

References

Iraqi Premier League seasons
1
Iraq